Alejandro Ibarra (born José Alejandro Ibarra De Llano on April 28, 1973, in Mexico City, D.F., Mexico) is a Mexican actor and singer.

Filmography

Awards and nominations

Premios TVyNovelas

References

External links

1973 births
Living people
Mexican male telenovela actors
Mexican male television actors
People from Mexico City
20th-century Mexican male actors
21st-century Mexican male actors